Ujević is a Croatian surname that may refer to
Marija Ujević-Galetović (born 1933), Croatian sculptor
Mate Ujević (1901–1967), Croatian poet and encyclopedist 
Tin Ujević (1891–1955), Croatian poet
Tin Ujević Award for contributions to Croatian poetry
MV Tin Ujević, a Croatian passenger cruiseferry

Croatian surnames